Box Cinema was a free-to-air Indian Hindi movie channel that was owned by Box Cinemedia Services Pvt. Ltd. The channel shows Bollywood and South Indian dubbed movies.

History 
Box Cinemedia Services Pvt Ltd launched Box Cinema in January 2019. This channel shows Bollywood, Hollywood, and South Indian dubbed movies. It was replaced by Atrangii on 6 June 2022.

References

Television channels and stations established in 2019
Television stations in Mumbai
Companies based in Mumbai